MV Ben-my-Chree is a Ro-Pax vessel which was launched and entered service in 1998. The flagship of the Isle of Man Steam Packet Company, it primarily operates on the Douglas to Heysham route. The Royal New Zealand Navy multi-role vessel , based on Ben-my-Chrees design, entered service in 2007.

History

Ben-my-Chree was ordered in 1997 by Sea Containers for the Isle of Man Steam Packet Company. Costing around £24 million, she was built by van der Giessen de Noord of the Netherlands and launched on 4 April 1998. The sixth vessel to carry the name, she is registered in Douglas, Isle of Man.

Ben-my-Chree entered service on 5 July 1998, Tynwald Day - the Isle of Man's national holiday. At a gross tonnage of around 12,000, she was the largest ship to enter service with the company. The vessel received criticism due to her low passenger capacity of 500 (carrying no more than 350 per sailing), and the fact she had no open deck for passengers. The company insisted this was a "comfort level" for the vessel's size.

In 2004, the vessel underwent a refit carried out by Cammell Laird to increase passenger capacity with the addition of a new passenger module. In 2014, Ben-my-Chree underwent a £1.6 million refit which included new LED lighting fitted to the lounge areas, refitted the crew rest area, this was also carried out by Cammell Laird.

Incidents

On 25 July 2008, Ben-my-Chree suffered a technical failure, with the Viking taking her Heysham sailing until she was repaired.

On 26 March 2010, Ben-my-Chree experienced unintended movement while berthed at Heysham Port, resulting in a walkway collapse, trapping eight people in the gangway compartment of the shore access structure; they were assisted in leaving by the fire service.

On the evening of 1 May 2013 when arriving in Douglas Harbour from Heysham, Ben-my-Chree struck part of the King Edward Pier linkspan. In the collision part of the ship was slightly damaged, meaning the evening departure to Heysham was delayed by two hours, with the Manannan arriving from Liverpool as replacement. The service arrived at Heysham only around thirty minutes late. Ben-my-Chree re-entered service the following day with a freight-only service to Heysham, and full service from that point onwards.

In December 2011, the Ben-my-Chree suffered a number of cancelled sailings due to high winds and a problem with a bow thruster that had been damaged in May that year. Arrangements to dry dock the ship in June and then in September had to be cancelled after the manufacturers, Wartsilla, failed to complete the necessary repairs. Chief executive of the Steam Packet Company wrote to the local newspaper, the Manx Independent to express the company's frustration at the ongoing problems.

On 12 February 2015, Ben-my-Chree lost control and collided with a fishing boat, while entering Douglas Harbour. The vessel's stern made contact with Battery Pier and a fishing boat at its mooring. It was found that the ship and the fishing boat only suffered superficial damage. The ship was checked by divers for signs of damage to the propellers and steering. It was then relocated to the Victoria Pier using a tug boat where passengers disembarked.

On 2 May 2015, the morning sailing from Douglas to Heysham and the afternoon return was cancelled. Ben-my-Chree was suffering from a "bow thruster... only operating on reduced power". On 16 May 2015, there was a suspected chimney stack lagging fire was detected on the 8.45am crossing from Douglas to Heysham. The sailing arrived in Heysham Port around 1 hour late and no passengers or crew were injured.

On 9 April 2017, Ben-my-Chree suffered an engine failure after arriving at Heysham Port. As a result two return crossings were cancelled and the vessel limped back to Douglas on one engine without passengers.

Design and construction
Ben-my-Chree is a Ro-Pax ferry, largely designed to carry freight, with two vehicle decks (decks 3 and 5) and two passenger accommodation decks (7 and 8). There are 20 four-berth cabins and crew accommodation for 22. Her freight capacity is 200 vehicles (1235m).

A refit during her first winter improved passenger accommodation. Reclining chairs were added in the forward and aft lounges and partitions added between the restaurant and bar areas. In 2004, a major refit allowed her to carry a full capacity of 636 passengers. A new accommodation section containing the Legends café/bar, Niarbyl Quiet Lounge and toilets was added. The refit also created an outside deck space and modifications were made to the vessel's stern door. Another refit in April 2008 included a new livery and internal refit.

The Royal New Zealand Navy multi-role vessel , based on Ben-my-Chrees design, entered service in 2007.

Service
On 16 July 2018, Ben-my-Chree completed 20 years of Manx service. She operates primarily on the Douglas to Heysham route, with occasional services to Belfast.

Future replacement
In March 2013, the chairman of local group TravelWatch, Brendan O’Friel, said "The Ben is currently mid-way through her life and she is starting now to develop problems of one sort or another. She is not as reliable as she was. A replacement would take two years to build and we are keen to see plans go ahead." In Issue 17 of the company newsletter, Steam Packet Times, Chief Executive Mark Woodward explained that "Now that the refinancing has been completed we have begun the process of assessing the longer term - it is clear that the most significant investment in the coming years will be replacement vessels for Ben-my-Chree and Manannan."

In May 2016, the Isle of Man Steam Packet Company outlined plans to replace the Ben-my-Chree as part of their proposed Strategic Sea Services offer to the Isle of Man Government. Under the proposal, the 1998-built Ben-my-Chree would be "replaced by 2019–2021" with a new build vessel that would be 140-metres long and have a capacity of 800 passengers. The Ben-my-Chree would then be retained as a third vessel to offer cover to the fleet.

On 1 December 2020 the replacement for the Ben-my-Chree was named MV Manxman. On Christmas Eve 2021 she was laid down at Hyundai Mipo Dockyard to be in commission by spring 2023.

References

Ships of the Isle of Man Steam Packet Company
Ferries of the Isle of Man
Merchant ships of the Isle of Man
1998 ships
Ships built in the Netherlands
Passenger ships of the United Kingdom